The Golden Eyes is a 2019 Chinese Adventure-Fantasy television series starring Lay Zhang, Wang Zixuan and Wang Yuexin. The television series is based on the novel of the same name in Mandarin (Chinese: 黄金瞳) written by Chinese author Dayan. It was aired on iQiyi from February 26, 2019 until April 12, 2019.

Synopsis 
It is said that only individuals with the "spirit language" (言灵 in Chinese and Kotodama in Japanese) can possess a pair of Golden Eyes. Zhuang Rui (Lay Zhang) is a simple pawnshop worker when his life was changed forever by a new set of eyes after an accident. When Zhuang Rui's upgrade leads to special magical powers that let him see through everything, he decides to use them to get rich by joining auctions for gemstones and betting on precious antiques. Meanwhile, undercover police officer Miao Feifei (Wang Zixuan), who is suspicious of his actions, decides to tag along for further investigation. With his newly founded squad, Zhuang Rui searches for the secrets and mysteries behind the Golden Eyes, where he finds out that being bestowed with the magical gift leads to numerous consequences and an eventual death.

Cast

Main 
 Lay Zhang as Zhuang Rui / Feng Quan
 Zhuang Rui is a simple but trustful pawnshop assistant who gets his eyes mutated with the power of the Golden Eyes which let him see through everything, including things that are not visible with the naked eye. He later uses his special ability to analyze gemstones and artifacts. He is also a tomb raider. Throughout his adventure, he discovers that the Golden Eyes have deadly side effects to one's health after much usage and link to the disappearance of his grandfather, who was an archaeological professor that searched for Feng Quan's tomb. Feng Quan is the first person who obtained the Golden Eyes. He was a former soldier who gained the Golden Eyes and became a powerful and wealthy merchant during the Qin dynasty. In present day, Zhuang Rui and his friends were used by villains to track down Feng Quan's tomb in order to find out the secret behind the Golden Eyes.
 Wang Zixuan as Miao Feifei
 a skilled undercover police officer who is observing Zhuang Rui for further investigation due to an incident. She soon gets involved in Zhuang Rui's plans and develops feelings for him.
Wang Yuexin as Huangfu Yun
 Zhaung Rui's adventurous best friend who desires to become rich. He also joins Zhuang Rui and Miao Feifei in missions.
Meng A Sai as Peng Fei
 A former special force soldier and former bodyguard of Xu Wei. He became good friends with Zhaung Rui and Huangfu Yun due to their kindness of helping others.

Supporting 

 Esther Chen as Qin Xuanbing
 Qin Haoran's adoptive daughter. Under her adoptive father's order she befriends Zhuang Rui and falls in love with him.
 Lee Li-Chun as De Shu/Ma Tengfeng
 Professor of the history department of Beijing University, a famous master of legendary restoration in the antiques industry, a teacher of Zhuang Rui, and a teacher of Yi, who is very caring for Zhuang Rui. He was a guide of archaeological team led by Zhuang Rui's grandfather many years ago who became obsessed over the Golden Eyes. He tried to obtain them for personal gain. He is the villain mastermind behind Qin Haoran who is seeking the secrets of the Golden Eyes. He is the murderer of Gu Tianfeng.
 Hong Xuan as Liu Jia
 Best friend of Miao Feifei and later girlfriend of Huangfu Yun.
 Shi Zhao Qi as Qin Haoran
 Qin Yanbing's adoptive father, chairman of the Xihuang Jewelry Group. He tries to uncover the secret of the Golden Eyes along with De Shu/Ma Tengfeng  by using Zhuang Rui to search for the location of Feng Quan's tomb. He murdered Qin Xuanbing's biological father, his business partner, because he was against working with De Shu/Ma Tengfeng. He disguised it as an assassination by her father's unknown business-related enemy as a cover up.    
 Hong Jiantao as Ma Pangzi
 A businessman who is interested in gemstones and artifacts. Zhuang Rui and Huangfu Yun befriend him in their adventure.
 Zhong Weilun as Liu Zhangfa
 Chen Yuwen as Xu Wei
 The general manager of Xu's jewelry corporation, insidious and cunning. Tries to pursue Qin Xuanbing for business gained. Got arrested by the police for crimes he committed against Zhuang Rui and Qin Xuanbing. He is one of the first enemies that Zhuang Rui made after gaining the Golden Eyes.
 Chen Jin as Hu Rong
 The chairman of Hu's Jewelry Group, Myanmar's emerald predator, who has the largest jade mine in Myanmar. Business rival of  Qin Haoran.
 Tan Kai as Xu Zhendong
 Xu's jewelry chairman, Xu Wei's uncle.
 Han Tongsheng as Gu Tianfeng
 The chairman of the Jade Association, the grandfather of Gu Dingyu and best friend of Zhuang Rui's grandfather. He treated Zhuang Rui as his own grandson. He was murdered by De Shu/Ma Tengfeng for getting close to the truth behind the disappearance of Zhuang Rui's grandfather and his  archaeological team in episode 35.
 Wang Wei as Professor Meng
 A archaeological professor that Zhuang Rui came across in his adventures. She led a archaeological team in Gansu.

Production 
This drama series shares the same production team with Lay Zhang's previous 2016 television series, The Mystic Nine. Chief director, Ling Nan, has previously directed The Mystic Nine Side Story: Flowers Bloom in February while the production team includes Daomu Biji writer cum screenwriter of The Mystic Nine, Xu Lei and the producers of The Mystic Nine, Bai Yicong and Zhang Yuanang. This television series would be the producing team and Lay's second collaboration. The novel saw a digital sales of over 30 million downloads online.

Casting 
A pre-release press conference was held on September 17, 2017 at the Phoenix International Media Center, Beijing where Lay Zhang was announced to be the male lead for the series. Posters for the television series were also unveiled during the pre-release press conference. The casting of the female lead became a trending topic for discussion on Sina Weibo soon after.

Lay Zhang officially signed the contract for the television series on stage with the director and producers of The Golden Eyes during his album premiere "2017 Lay Zhang Showcase" for his studio album Lay 02 Sheep which was held at the Beijing National Aquatics Center on October 12.

Filming 
Principal photography started with an opening ceremony on January 12, 2018 at Huairou District, Beijing. Filming also took place in Ukraine from March 10 to March 17 and subsequently in Yunnan, Ningxia and Inner Mongolia. The cast crew sourced for locations four months ahead of filming and went through much trouble transporting equipment to remote locations due to harsh terrain. Filming for all 60 episodes took a total of 150 days.

International broadcast
In Malaysia, the drama will air on Astro Quan Jia HD.

Original soundtrack

Awards and nominations

Notes

References 

Chinese fantasy television series
2019 Chinese television series debuts
Television shows based on Chinese novels
Chinese web series
IQIYI original programming
2019 Chinese television series endings
2019 web series debuts
Television series by Tencent Pictures
Television series by iQiyi Pictures